The 1995 NBA draft took place on June 28, 1995, at SkyDome in Toronto, Ontario, Canada. It marked the first NBA draft to be held outside the United States and was the first draft for the two Canadian expansion teams, Toronto Raptors and Vancouver Grizzlies.  Kevin Garnett, who was taken fifth in this draft, is notable for being the first player in two decades to be selected straight out of high school. Garnett ultimately gathered fifteen All Star selections, nine All-NBA selections (four of those being First-Teams), one NBA MVP award, and multiple other accolades. Rasheed Wallace and Jerry Stackhouse also had successful careers, being four-time and two-time All-Stars respectively. Wallace won an NBA championship in 2004 with the Detroit Pistons, while Stackhouse scored the most total points in the league in 2000, also with the Pistons.

The other remaining top selections had relatively productive careers, but were considered to have never reached their full potential. Joe Smith put up solid, but unspectacular numbers throughout his career and is generally considered a disappointment for a first overall selection. He was also involved in a salary cap scandal with the Minnesota Timberwolves. Antonio McDyess was a one-time All-Star, but serious and continuing knee injuries decreased much of his effectiveness in the prime of his career. Damon Stoudamire was the 1995–96 NBA Rookie of the Year and had a solid career although he was arrested, suspended and fined several times for marijuana possession. Bryant Reeves impressed early in his career but a season after being granted a six-year, $61.8 million contract extension, his numbers went down due to weight and back problems and he retired after only playing six NBA seasons, all with the Vancouver Grizzlies.

This draft was also notable for two storied NCAA players who failed to meet lofty expectations in the NBA, Ed O'Bannon and Shawn Respert. O'Bannon had received national accolades for leading the UCLA Bruins to the NCAA Championship, but only played two years in the NBA. Respert played only four seasons in the NBA, while secretly hiding that he was suffering from stomach cancer.

The Vancouver Grizzlies and the Toronto Raptors were not able to win the NBA draft lottery, due to pre-negotiated rules. This would extend into the 1997-1998 season.

Draft

Notable undrafted players
The following players went undrafted in the 1995 NBA Draft but later played in the NBA.

Trades involving Draft picks

Draft-day trades
The following trades involving drafted players were made on the day of the draft.
 The Los Angeles Clippers traded Randy Woods and the draft rights of Antonio McDyess to the Denver Nuggets for Rodney Rogers and the draft rights to Brent Barry.

Early entrants

College underclassmen
The following college basketball players successfully applied for early draft entrance.

  Cory Alexander – G, Virginia (junior)
  Mario Bennett – F, Arizona State (junior)
  Chris Carr – G/F, Southern Illinois (junior)
  Michael Evans – Norfolk State (junior)
  Rashard Griffith – C, Wisconsin (sophomore)
  Martin Lewis – Seward CC (sophomore)
  Antonio McDyess – F, Alabama (sophomore)
  Joe Smith – F, Maryland (sophomore)
  Jerry Stackhouse – G, North Carolina (sophomore)
  Scotty Thurman – F, Arkansas (junior)
  Gary Trent – F, Ohio (junior)
  David Vaughn III – F, Memphis (junior)
  Rasheed Wallace – F, North Carolina (sophomore)
  Corliss Williamson – F, Arkansas (junior)
  Darroll Wright – G, Missouri Western (junior)

High school players
The following high school players successfully applied for early draft entrance.

  Kevin Garnett – F, Farragut Academy (Chicago, Illinois)

See also
 List of first overall NBA draft picks

References

External links
1995 NBA Draft

Draft
National Basketball Association draft
NBA draft
NBA draft
Basketball in Toronto
Events in Toronto